Pickering House is an historic house in the town of Wolfeboro, New Hampshire. It is located on South Main Street (New Hampshire Route 109) in the town center. The property was listed on the National Register of Historic Places (NRHP) in 2019.

The main house and a barn date to 1813; ells were added circa 1843 and 1870. The house was built by Daniel Pickering, who owned multiple businesses in Wolfeboro and was the town's first postmaster.

In 2016, after the property had fallen into disrepair, it was sold to new owners. They made significant improvements to the property, turning it into a boutique hotel, which opened in 2018.

See also
National Register of Historic Places listings in Carroll County, New Hampshire

References

External links
Pickering House Inn
Wolfeboro residents rescue 19th century Pickering House at WCVB-TV (video)

Houses on the National Register of Historic Places in New Hampshire
Houses in Carroll County, New Hampshire
Houses completed in 1813
National Register of Historic Places in Carroll County, New Hampshire
Wolfeboro, New Hampshire